Jarnuty may refer to the following places:
Jarnuty, Masovian Voivodeship (east-central Poland)
Jarnuty, Gmina Łomża in Podlaskie Voivodeship (north-east Poland)
Jarnuty, Gmina Wizna in Podlaskie Voivodeship (north-east Poland)